Mount Nivelle is a mountain located at the NW end of Elk Lakes Provincial Park in British Columbia, Canada. It was named in 1918 after Marshal Robert Nivelle, and is one of the series of mountains there named after French generals of the First World War, including Cordonnier, Foch, Joffre, Mangin, Sarrail, and Pétain.

References

External links
 '2009-08-02 Mount Fox" Photograph of range with Mt. Nivelle in the middle.

Three-thousanders of British Columbia
Canadian Rockies